General elections were held in Greenland on 3 December 2002. The result was victory for the Siumut party, which won 10 of the 31 seats in the Parliament.

Results

References

Greenland
2002 in Greenland
Elections in Greenland
December 2002 events in North America